Lewis Gordon is an American philosopher.

Lewis Gordon may also refer to:

Lewis Gordon (civil engineer)
Lewis Gordon, 3rd Marquess of Huntly (c. 1626–1653)
Lewis Gordon (Jacobite)
Lewis Gordon (minister), moderator of the General Assembly of the Church of Scotland in 1815
Lewis Gordon (footballer) (born 2001), English-born Scottish footballer

See also

Louis Gordon, English musician
Lou Gordon (disambiguation)